Jeannette Kavira Mapera (born 8 April 1963) is the current Minister of Culture and Arts in the Democratic Republic of the Congo.  She is a member of the Federalist Christian Democracy-Convention of Federalists for Christian Democracy (DCF-COFEDEC).

Biography
Kavira was born in the eastern city of Bukavu on April 8, 1963.  She attended the University of Kinshasa and graduated with a degree in Economics and International Economics.

In the 2006 general election, Kavira was elected to the National Assembly as a delegate of Lubero territory in North Kivu province.

She also served briefly as the Deputy Managing Director of Cohydro, a Congolese hydrocarbon company.

She took office as Minister of Culture and Arts on 23 February 2010, succeeding Ezra Kambale, the previous Minister.

Notes

1963 births
Living people
People from Bukavu
Culture ministers
Government ministers of the Democratic Republic of the Congo
Members of the National Assembly (Democratic Republic of the Congo)
People from North Kivu
21st-century Democratic Republic of the Congo people